Odra is a village in Croatia, administratively part of the city of Zagreb; population 1,866.

References

Populated places in the City of Zagreb